Jeloki Forest Park is a forest park in the Gambia. It covers 858 hectares.

The park was founded in 1953.

References

Forest parks of the Gambia